Himalayan Sherpa Club is a Nepali professional football club based in the city of Kathmandu (originally from Hattigauda), that competes in the Martyr's Memorial A-Division League, top flight of Nepali football. They play at the Dasarath Rangasala Stadium.

History
The club was founded on 25 September 2006 and played their first tournament at the 2007 edition of the Aaha! Gold Cup. According to RSSSF, the club was "promoted from 4th to 2nd level within 2 months". The club were promoted to the ANFA 'A' Division League one year later.

Due to financial disagreements between the League Association ANFA and the Nepal Football Association, the 2007/08 season was canceled before the start of the season. In the following three years, the league paused, the game operations only started again with the 2011 season. Himalayan Sherpa was fifth in his first season in the top Nepalese league of 18 clubs. Through this success, the club managed to sign the Ugandan international Samuel Mubiru on loan from Uganda Revenue Authority SC in 2011/12, the Tanzania's Castory Mumbala and the two former Nigerian youth players Hope Rally and Segun Akinade.  Mubiru became the top assist-giver of the league and was therefore ordered back to Uganda Revenue Authority SC after the expiry of his loan agreement. The club celebrated the greatest success in club history in its second season in the top division, when it took second place and thus won the runner-up title of the National League.

Sponsorship 
Since 2011, Yeti Airlines is sponsoring Himalayan Sherpa Club with Nrs 20 lakh per year for which the club's official name is Yeti Himalayan Sherpa Club.

Squads

Current squad

Record by seasons

Honours

National 

 Martyr's Memorial B-Division League
 Champions (1): 2007–08

Simara Gold Cup
 Champions (1):  2011

References

External links
Himalayan Sherpa Club at Global Sports Archive

Football clubs in Nepal
2006 establishments in Nepal